Epicephala squamella is a moth of the family Gracillariidae. It is known from Vietnam.

References

Epicephala
Moths described in 2001